Herbert Ward Page (January 31, 1876 – September 1, 1949) was an American football coach.  He was the seventh head football coach at Washburn University in Topeka, Kansas, serving for one season, in 1902, and compiling a record of 3–4.  Page died on September 1, 1949, at his home in Ottawa, Kansas. He had practiced law in the Topeka area for around 50 years.

Head coaching record

References

External links
 

1876 births
1949 deaths
Washburn Ichabods football coaches
Kansas lawyers
People from Edgerton, Wisconsin